Up the Downstair is the second studio album by British progressive rock band Porcupine Tree, first released in June 1993. It was originally intended to be a double album set including the song "Voyage 34", which was instead released as a single in 1992, and other material that ended up on the Staircase Infinities  EP (1994). In 2005, it was partially re-recorded, fully re-mixed, remastered and re-released along with the Staircase Infinities EP as a double album. The re-release contains a re-mix by Steven Wilson incorporating newly recorded drums by Gavin Harrison that replace the electronic drums of the original version. Another re-release on double vinyl was pressed on 14 August 2008 on Kscope records. This is identical to the 2005 release, except it is printed on coloured vinyl and the Staircase Infinities disc contains the song "Phantoms".

According to Wilson, Up the Downstair channeled "the Orb and the Future Sound of London, but also Floyd and Ozric Tentacles. If I liked it, I didn’t give a fuck."

Track listing
All music written by Steven Wilson.

2005 Remastered And Remixed Edition
Many songs differ a little in length in the revamped edition of Up the Downstair.

Personnel

Porcupine Tree
Steven Wilson - vocals, all other instruments

Additional personnel
Colin Edwin – Bass guitar on "Always Never"
Richard Barbieri – Electronics on "Up the Downstair"
Suzanne J. Barbieri – Vocals on "Up the Downstair"
Gavin Harrison – Drums (Disc 1 2004 edition only)
Alan Duffy - co-songwriting on "Always Never", "Small Fish", "Fadeaway" & "The Joke's on You"

Reviews
Professional reviews:
Melody Maker - They've embarked upon a mission impossible: to create a truly Nineties progressive rock soundscape, utilising modern technology but avoiding prog pomposity. And they've managed it with room to spare. It's a strange and wonderful brew, taking in Orb ambience, FSoL dub, Metallica steel and all points in between. Ambient space dubs, technological cut-ups and Gregorian chants texture the sound, but the fire at the heart of the noise comes from good old guitar. Be warned, there are solos here, but they're played with a force and a purity that defies indulgence.
Organ - "Up The Downstair" is an LP that hides many surprises for the attentive listener. After a few spins you realise that even the sounds mixed into the background and the vocal interventions from old "drug" records all play a part in this warm, soothing lysergic tapestry that contains sparse, but matching lyrics. When I wrote an article on Porcupine Tree last year (published in Crohinga Well 2) I predicted that this act would become a "third way" in New British Psychedelia (the first and second being the psychedelic rock of Bevis Frond and the spacey festival sounds of Ozric Tentacles, of course). This record only confirms my statement. "Up The Downstair" is a record to get incredibly stoned to (and you will...)!
CMJ - Up The Downstair retains the band's willowy roots in Albion psychedelia but expands the brief, dropping its cheesy self-consciousness while infusing some contemporary dance auras (from acidic mesmerism to almost funky syncopation) with more 'group-like' interaction.

External links
Porcupine Tree Official Website
Up the Downstair at Snapper Music

References

Porcupine Tree albums
1993 albums